Polyphlebium angustatum is a species of fern in the family Hymenophyllaceae. It is found in South America and on a number of Atlantic islands, including Tristan da Cunha. The genus Polyphlebium is accepted in the Pteridophyte Phylogeny Group classification of 2016 (PPG I), but not by other sources. , Plants of the World Online sank the genus into a broadly defined Trichomanes, treating this species as Trichomanes angustatum.

References

Flora of South America
Flora of Tristan da Cunha
Hymenophyllales
Least concern plants
Taxonomy articles created by Polbot
Taxobox binomials not recognized by IUCN